Kyran Moore (born September 19, 1996) is an American professional gridiron football wide receiver for the Edmonton Elks of the Canadian Football League (CFL). He played college football at Austin Peay.

College career
Moore played college football for Austin Peay from 2014 to 2017.

Professional career

Saskatchewan Roughriders
In May 2018, Moore signed with the Saskatchewan Roughriders. He was moved to the team's practice roster on June 10, 2018. He was promoted to the active roster on August 24, 2018, and played in his first CFL game the next day. He signed a one-year contract extension with the Roughriders on January 13, 2021.

Edmonton Elks
Moore joined the Edmonton Elks as a free agent on February 14, 2023.

References

External links
 Austin Peay bio

1996 births
Living people
American players of Canadian football
American football wide receivers
Canadian football wide receivers
People from Bessemer, Alabama
Austin Peay Governors football players
Saskatchewan Roughriders players